The Hay Canyon Wind Farm is an electricity generating wind farm facility located in Moro, Oregon, United States. It is owned by Iberdrola Renewables and began operations in 2009. The facility has a generating capacity of 101 megawatts. The farm sells power to the Snohomish County Public Utility District.

See also

List of wind farms in the United States
Wind power in Oregon

References

 

Energy infrastructure completed in 2009
Buildings and structures in Sherman County, Oregon
Wind farms in Oregon
2009 establishments in Oregon